is a Japanese confectionery company founded in 1946.

References

External links

Kabaya Foods  

Food and drink companies of Japan
Snack food manufacturers of Japan
Companies based in Okayama Prefecture
Food and drink companies established in 1946
Japanese companies established in 1946
Japanese confectionery
Japanese brand foods
Japanese brands
Confectionery companies of Japan